Tasters (formerly known as Taster's Choice) is an Italian metalcore band from Livorno, Italy. They formed in 1999 and have released two studio albums, Shining (2005) and The Rebirth (2009).

As part of the metalcore scene, Tasters has opened for Cancer Bats, Thirty Seconds to Mars, Sonic Syndicate, Evergreen Terrace, Terror, Aiden and other American bands touring abroad. In December 2009, they toured with Scottish band Bleed from Within and as headliners in February–March 2010, also touring Russia for 30 shows. In June 2011, Tasters announced that the band has signed to Nuclear Blast for the release of their album Reckless Till the End.

Discography
As Taster's Choice
 Shining (2005)
 The Rebirth (2009)

As Tasters
 Reckless Till the End (2011)
 De Rerum Natura (2017)

Band members
Current
Luke Pezzini – guitar
Fabrizio Pagni – keyboards, piano, backing vocals
Andrea Bessone – drums
Manuel Manca – vocals

Past
Marco Bassini – vocals
Mattia Biagini – bass
Francesco Tonarini – percussion
Pietro Marsili – drums
Simone Fiori – guitar
Filippo Gherardi "Dj Plasma" – DJ console
Daniele Nelli – vocals (currently in Upon This Dawning)
Ale "Demonoid" Lera – drums
Carlo Cremascoli – bass
Tommy Antonini – guitar

References

Italian metalcore musical groups
Nuclear Blast artists